Fairchild Systems was a United States defense contractor which is now part of BAE Systems Electronics, Intelligence & Support. A descendant of Fairchild Camera and Instrument, the San Francisco Chronicle described Fairchild Systems as "one of the legendary names of Silicon Valley" and that in "the late 1960s, [its] Bay Area operations were the training ground for the engineers who went on to found Intel and other top semiconductor companies."

History
Fairchild Weston Systems was acquired by Loral Corporation in mid-1989. The group was renamed as the Loral Fairchild Systems divisions of Loral Corp.

On 22 April 1996 Lockheed Martin completed the acquisition of Loral Corporation's defense electronics and system integration businesses, which included Fairchild, for $9.1 billion. The company became Lockheed Fairchild Systems. 

In 2000 Lockheed Martin grouped Fairchild with Sanders Associates and Lockheed Martin Space Electronics & Communications under the Lockheed Martin Aerospace Electronic Systems division. BAE Systems agreed to acquire the division in July 2000 and completed its acquisition on 27 November.

References

Electronics companies of the United States
Defense companies of the United States
Technology companies based in the San Francisco Bay Area
Technology companies established in 1982
Technology companies disestablished in 2000
1982 establishments in California
2000 disestablishments in California
BAE Systems subsidiaries and divisions
Defunct companies based in the San Francisco Bay Area